The Hodson Baronetcy, of Holybrooke House in the County of Wicklow, is a title in the Baronetage of Ireland. It was created on 28 August 1789 for Robert Hodson. He was a descendant of Reverend John Hodson, Dean of Clogher and Bishop of Elphin, the member of a family that had long been settled at Houghton, Staffordshire, England and was High Sheriff of Westmeath (1776), Wicklow (1786) and Cavan (1791).

Hodson baronets, of Holybrooke House (1789)
Sir Robert Hodson, 1st Baronet (1747–1809)
Sir Robert Adair Hodson, 2nd Baronet (1802–1831)
Sir George Frederick John Hodson, 3rd Baronet (1806–1888)
Sir Robert Adair Hodson, 4th Baronet (1853–1921), succeeding his father
Sir Edmond Adair Hodson, 5th Baronet (1893–1972), succeeding his uncle
Sir Michael Robin Adderley Hodson, 6th Baronet (1932–2022)
Sir Patrick Richard Hodson, 7th Baronet (1934–2022)
Sir Mark Adair Hodson, 8th Baronet (1964–2023)
Sir Edward Charles Adair Hodson, 9th Baronet (born 1998)

References

Kidd, Charles, Williamson, David (editors). Debrett's Peerage and Baronetage (1990 edition). New York: St Martin's Press, 1990.

Hodson
1789 establishments in Ireland